The Black Sea Naval Force (also known as BLACKSEAFOR or the Black Sea Naval Cooperation Task Group) is a Black Sea naval cooperation program established in 2001 on the initiative of Turkey with the participation of Bulgaria, Romania, Ukraine, Russia and Georgia.

History
The original purpose of BLACKSEAFOR was "to cooperatively promote security and stability in the Black Sea maritime area and beyond, strengthen friendship and good neighborly relations among the regional States, and increase interoperability among those states' naval forces".

The BLACKSEAFOR has conducted several joint naval drills since its formation, however it has been suspended several times. The 2008 Russo-Georgian war lead Georgia to suspend its involvement in BLACKSEAFOR drills and Russia to refuse to take part in drills involving Georgia. The partnership was effectively suspended in 2014 following the Russian annexation of Crimea and War in Donbas. In 2015, after a Russian plane was shot down by Turkish forces, Russia suspended its BLACKSEAFOR membership.

See also
Operation Black Sea Harmony
1936 Montreux Convention governing the passage of military ships into the Black Sea
Organization of the Black Sea Economic Cooperation
Operation Active Endeavour

References

Further reading

Black Sea organizations
Bulgarian Navy
Military of Georgia (country)
Romanian Naval Forces
Russian Navy
Turkish Naval Forces
Ukrainian Navy
Multinational units and formations
Military units and formations established in 2001
Naval diplomacy